Relationism may refer to:

 Relational theory, in physics
 Relationism (Mannheim), a concept in the sociology of knowledge developed by Karl Mannheim
 Relationism (philosophy),  philosophical position that relations exist as ontological primitives, which is contrasted to relationalism

See also
Relation (disambiguation)
Relativity (disambiguation)